A perfect storm is a confluence of events that drastically aggravates a situation.

Perfect storm may also refer to:

 1991 Perfect Storm, a weather event 
The Perfect Storm (book), a 1997 book by Sebastian Junger about the 1991 Perfect Storm
The Perfect Storm (film), a 2000 film adapted from the book

Television
 "Perfect Storm" (Flashpoint)
 "The Perfect Storm" (The O.C.)
 "The Perfect Storm" (Pretty Little Liars)
 "Perfect Storm" (Tru Calling)
 "Perfect Storm" (Grey's Anatomy)
 Perfect Storm: Disasters That Changed The World, a Canadian historical documentary series

Music
 The Perfect Storm (album), by Twista
 "Perfect Storm" (song), by Brad Paisley
 "Perfect Storm", by AJ Tracey from his 2021 album Flu Game

Other
 The Perfect Storm, a concept in the ministry and marketing from John Paul Jackson
 Carl Crawford (born 1981), nicknamed "The Perfect Storm", an American professional baseball left fielder with the Los Angeles Dodgers